Kristoff is a version of Kristopher (Scandinavian, Greek): respelling of Christopher.

People 
 Kristoff St. John (1966-2019), American actor.
 Ivan Kristoff (born 1968), aviator, rescue worker, and rope access expert
 Kristoff Raczyñski (born 1974), Mexican actor, film producer, screenwriter and TV host
 Kristoff Deprez (born 1981), Belgian footballer
 Alexander Kristoff (born 1987), Norwegian road bicycle racer
 Romano Kristoff, Spanish born actor, writer and director
 Kristoff Krane (born 1983), American alternative hip hop artist
 Jay Kristoff, an Australian author

Characters 
 Kristoff (Disney), a character from the 2013 Disney animated film, Frozen
 Kristoff Vernard (or Kristoff von Doom), a character appearing in the Marvel Comics universe

Television 
 Kristoff Presenta, a Mexican television show

See also 
 Kristof
 
 Kris (name), given name or diminutive